Hiroshi Kondoh is a computer engineer with Centellax, Inc. in Santa Rosa, California. He was named a Fellow of the Institute of Electrical and Electronics Engineers (IEEE) in 2015 for his contributions to microwave and millimeter wave MMIC technologies.

References

Fellow Members of the IEEE
Living people
Year of birth missing (living people)
Place of birth missing (living people)
American electrical engineers